The Woolley Apartments, at 303 N. Hayes Ave. in Pocatello, Idaho, is an apartment building constructed in 1920. It was listed on the National Register of Historic Places in 1985.

It is a four-story brick and wood building upon a concrete foundation. Its design reflects influence of Prairie School and Craftsman styles, especially in projecting wooden bays on north and south sides. The bricks are laid in common bond.

The developer was Hyrum Smith Woolley, Jr., whose father Hyrum Smith Woolley, Jr. was prominent in business in Idaho, whose father-in-law was William Budge and whose grandfather was Charles Coulson Rich, early Mormon pioneer and founder of San Bernardino, California.

References

National Register of Historic Places in Bannock County, Idaho
Prairie School architecture in Idaho
American Craftsman architecture in Idaho
Residential buildings completed in 1920
1920 establishments in Idaho
Apartment buildings on the National Register of Historic Places in Idaho
Buildings and structures in Pocatello, Idaho